Ernst Priesner (12 May 1934 – missing since 19 July 1994) was an Austrian biologist. He pioneered in the field of sex pheromones at the Max Planck Institute for Behavioral Physiology in Seewiesen. His entomological main emphasis was on the field of Hymenoptera and butterflies.

Life 

Ernst Priesner attended the high school in Klagenfurt. Afterwards he studied biology at the University of Vienna where he worked on his thesis in the research group of Wilhelm Kühnelt at the Zoological Institute. In 1959 he received his Ph.D.

After his time in Vienna, Priesner worked first with the Zoological Institute of the University of Göttingen, before joining the work group of Dietrich Schneider at the Ludwig Maximilian University of Munich in 1963. Two years later he followed Schneider to Seewiesen to the local Max Planck Institute. In 1974 Ernst Priesner lived at the University of Erlangen, where he focused on the study of insect pheromones, particularly Sesiidae.

In 1983 Priesner received the Gay-Lussac-Humboldt-Prize for his work in the field of pheromone research. He was the driving force in the study of clearwings by means of attracting with synthetically produced pheromones. Several new species have been discovered with this method. Priesner developed a set of 21 pheromones which succeeds in attracting almost all types of wing borers.

Ernst Priesner disappeared in July 1994, when he did not return from checking insect traps in the mountains of Garmisch-Partenkirchen in the area of the Pflegersee. Various search operations by the mountain rescue were not successful.

See also
List of people who disappeared

Publications 
J. Boeckh, Ernst Priesner, D. Schneider, M. Jacobson: Olfactory Receptor Response to the Cockroach Sexual Attractant. In: Science. 141, 1963, S. 716–717, .
Ernst Priesner: Die interspezifischen Wirkungen der Sexuallockstoffe der Saturniidae (Lepidoptera). In: Zeitschrift für vergleichende Physiologie. 61, 1968, S. 263–297, .
Karl-Ernst Kaissling, Ernst Priesner: Die Riechschwelle des Seidenspinners. In: Die Naturwissenschaften. 57, 1970, S. 23–28, .
Peter Witzgall, Ernst Priesner: Wind-tunnel study on attraction inhibitor in male Coleophora laricella Hbn. (Lepidoptera: Coleophoridae). In: Journal of Chemical Ecology. 17, 1991, S. 1355–1362, .

References 

1934 births
1990s missing person cases
20th-century Austrian zoologists
Austrian expatriates in Germany
Academic staff of the Ludwig Maximilian University of Munich
Missing people
Missing person cases in Austria
Scientists from Vienna